The Primetime Emmy Award for Outstanding Directing for a Comedy Series is presented to the best directing of a television comedy series.

Winners and nominations

1950s

1960s

1970s

1980s

1990s

2000s

2010s

2020s

Total awards by network
 CBS – 15
 ABC – 14
 NBC – 14
 Amazon – 4
 Fox – 4
 HBO – 4
 Apple TV+ - 1
 FX – 1
 HBO Max — 1
 Pop TV – 1

Programs with multiple awards

4 awards
 M*A*S*H (consecutive)
 Modern Family (consecutive)

3 awards
 Frasier (2 consecutive)

2 awards
 All in the Family
 Cheers
 The Cosby Show (consecutive)
 The Dick Van Dyke Show (consecutive)
 Malcolm in the Middle (consecutive)
 The Mary Tyler Moore Show
 Taxi (consecutive)
 Transparent (consecutive) 
 The Wonder Years (consecutive)

Programs with multiple nominations

26 nominations
 M*A*S*H

11 nominations
 Cheers

10 nominations
 Curb Your Enthusiasm

9 nominations
 Modern Family

8 nominations
 The Mary Tyler Moore Show
 30 Rock

7 nominations
 The Larry Sanders Show
 Seinfeld
 Silicon Valley
 Veep
 Will & Grace

6 nominations
 All in the Family
 Entourage
 The Golden Girls
 Murphy Brown

5 nominations
 The Marvelous Mrs. Maisel
 The Wonder Years

4 nominations
 Ally McBeal
 Atlanta
 Barry
 The Dick Van Dyke Show
 Friends
 Glee
 Louie
 Malcolm in the Middle
 The Office
 Sex and the City
 Ted Lasso

3 nominations
 Buffalo Bill
 The Cosby Show
 The Danny Thomas Show
 Everybody Loves Raymond
 Frasier
 Kate & Allie
 The Red Skelton Show
 Taxi

2 nominations
 Barney Miller
 The Beverly Hillbillies
 Bewitched
 The Big Bang Theory
 The Days and Nights of Molly Dodd
 Designing Women
 Dream On
 Flight of the Conchords
 The Garry Moore Show
 Get Smart
 Girls
 Hacks
 Happy Days
 The Jack Benny Show
 Mad About You
 Maude
 The Monkees
 Only Murders in the Building
 Scrubs
 Soap
 Sports Night
 3rd Rock from the Sun
 Transparent

Individuals with multiple awards

5 awards
 James Burrows (2 consecutive)

4 awards
 Jay Sandrich (2 consecutive)

3 awards
 Todd Holland (2 consecutive)

2 awards
 David Lee
 Gail Mancuso (consecutive)
 Gene Reynolds (consecutive)
 John Rich
 Joey Soloway (consecutive)

Individuals with multiple nominations

26 nominations
 James Burrows

10 nominations
 Jay Sandrich

9 nominations
 Alan Alda

8 nominations
 Todd Holland

6 nominations
 Terry Hughes

5 nominations
 Seymour Berns
 Mike Judge
 Burt Metcalfe
 John Rich
 Robert B. Weide

4 nominations
 Paul Bogart
 Louis C.K.
 James Frawley
 Barnet Kellman
 Will Mackenzie
 Gail Mancuso
 Jerry Paris
 Gene Reynolds

3 nominations
 Andy Ackerman
 Hy Averback
 Peter Baldwin
 Paris Barclay
 Tom Cherones
 Charles S. Dubin
 Julian Farino
 Bill Hader
 Michael Lembeck
 Sheldon Leonard
 Beth McCarthy-Miller
 Bill Persky
 Lee Shallat-Chemel
 Amy Sherman-Palladino

2 nominations
 Lucia Aniello
 William Asher
 Daniel Attias
 Jamie Babbit
 Alec Berg
 James Bobin
 Marc Buckland
 Mark Cendrowski
 Larry Charles
 Hal Cooper
 Joan Darling
 MJ Delaney
 Michael Dinner
 Jim Drake
 Lena Dunham
 Michael Engler
 Dave Geisel
 Donald Glover
 Bryan Gordon
 Michael Patrick King
 David Lee
 Steven Levitan
 David Mandel
 Charles McDougall
 Hiro Murai
 Daniel Palladino
 Noam Pitlik
 Jeffrey Melman
 William D. Russell
 Thomas Schlamme
 Jack Shea
 Joey Soloway
 David Steinberg
 Dale Stern
 Jay Tarses
 Peter Tewksbury
 Richard Whorf
 Jason Winer
 Bud Yorkin

See also
 Primetime Emmy Award for Outstanding Directing for a Drama Series

References

Directing for a Comedy Series